The 2013–14  Linafoot season (known as the Vodacom Super Ligue 2013–14 for sponsorship reasons) was the 53rd since its establishment. It started on 27 October 2013, and concluded 11 May 2014. A total of 16 clubs participated in the 2013–14 season.

League table

Group A

Group B

Championship Play off

References

Linafoot seasons
football
football
Congo